The 2020 Texas A&M Aggies football team represented Texas A&M University in the 2020 NCAA Division I FBS football season. The Aggies played their home games at Kyle Field in College Station, Texas, and competed in the Western Division of the Southeastern Conference (SEC). They were led by third-year head coach Jimbo Fisher. The Aggies finished the season 9–1 with a final ranking of #4 in both the AP and the Coaches poll.

Preseason

SEC Media Days
In the preseason media poll, Texas A&M was predicted to finish in fourth in the West Division.

Coaching staff

Schedule
Texas A&M announced its 2020 football schedule on August 7, 2019. The 2020 schedule consisted of 7 home, 4 away, and 1 neutral game in the regular season.

The Aggies had games scheduled against Abilene Christian, Fresno State, Colorado, and North Texas, which were canceled due to the COVID-19 pandemic. In place of the canceled games, Florida and Tennessee were added to the Aggies' schedule to fill out the 10-game, conference only format.

Rankings

Game summaries

Vanderbilt

Statistics

Texas A&M started their 2020 season against Vanderbilt at home. This was their third time playing Vanderbilt and they continued their undefeated streak against them.

at No. 2 Alabama

Statistics

This was A&M's thirteenth time to face Alabama, the ninth time since the Aggies moved the SEC. Alabama continued their win streak against A&M since 2013.

No. 4 Florida

Statistics

Originally A&M wasn't supposed to play Florida. This was the fifth meeting between the two teams and third since A&M moved to the SEC.

at Mississippi State

Statistics

This was the fourteenth meeting between the two teems, the ninth since A&M moved to the SEC. A&M evened up the series tied 7 and 7.

Arkansas

Statistics

at South Carolina

Statistics

LSU

Statistics

at Auburn

 
Statistics

The Aggies scored 17 unanswered points in the 4th quarter. The Aggies then got their 1st win against Auburn for the first time since 2016.

at Tennessee

Statistics

vs. No. 13 North Carolina (Orange Bowl)

Statistics

Players drafted into the NFL

References

Texas AandM
Texas A&M Aggies football seasons
Orange Bowl champion seasons
Texas AandM Aggies football